Pembroke Public Library may refer to:

Pembroke Public Library, a single-branch public library in Pembroke, Ontario, Canada.
Pembroke Public Library, a branch of the Statesboro Regional Public Libraries in Georgia.